Filip I (Filip Sokolović) was the Serbian patriarch from 1591 to 1592. He succeeded Patriarch Jerotej Sokolović on the throne of the Peć Patriarchate on 15 July 1591. At the time when he was the patriarch, the situation for the Serbian Orthodox Church was very critical. Filip died in 1592 and Patriarch Jovan Kantul became his heir.

Patriarch Filip is mentioned in an inscription on Symeon the Metaphrast, which was transcribed in the Ozren Monastery in the temple of the Holy Father Nicholas by Hierodeacon Timotije.

See also
 Serbian Patriarch
 List of heads of the Serbian Orthodox Church
 Makarije Sokolović
 Antonije Sokolović
 Gerasim Sokolović
 Savatije Sokolović

Literature
"Filip Sokolović", Folk encyclopedia, Zagreb: Bibliographic Institute, 1927

References 

Year of birth missing
1592 deaths